Donald Roland "Roley" Williams (10 July 1927 – 30 June 1999) was a former Welsh professional footballer.

Williams was playing Welsh league football for Milford United when he was spotted by Cardiff City manager Cyril Spiers. A number of clubs were interested at the time, including his home town club Swansea Town, but he signed a contract with Cardiff in February 1949. Despite suffering numerous small injuries during his seven years at the club, he quickly became a regular in the side providing numerous chances for the club's prolific striker Wilf Grant to score 26 goals during the 1951–52 season. His injuries meant he never played a full season for the club and in 1956 he was allowed to leave and join Northampton Town. His spell at the club was brief and he moved into non-league football with Bath City and Lovells Athletic before retiring.

References

1927 births
Footballers from Swansea
Welsh footballers
Cardiff City F.C. players
Northampton Town F.C. players
English Football League players
1999 deaths
Lovell's Athletic F.C. players
Association football forwards
Milford United F.C. players